This is a list of the bird species recorded in Tonga. The avifauna of Tonga include a total of 88 species, of which two are endemic, five have been introduced by humans. 10 species are globally threatened.

This list's taxonomic treatment (designation and sequence of orders, families and species) and nomenclature (common and scientific names) follow the conventions of The Clements Checklist of Birds of the World, 2022 edition. The family accounts at the beginning of each heading reflect this taxonomy, as do the species counts found in each family account. Introduced and accidental species are included in the total counts for Tonga.

The following tags have been used to highlight several categories. The commonly occurring native species do not fall into any of these categories.

(A) Accidental - a species that rarely or accidentally occurs in Tonga
(Ex) Extinct - a species which no longer exists
(E) Endemic - a species endemic to Tonga
(I) Introduced - a species introduced to Tonga as a consequence, direct or indirect, of human actions

Ducks, geese, and waterfowl

Order: AnseriformesFamily: Anatidae

Anatidae includes the ducks and most duck-like waterfowl, such as geese and swans. These birds are adapted to an aquatic existence with webbed feet, flattened bills, and feathers that are excellent at shedding water due to an oily coating.

Pacific black duck, Anas superciliosa
Northern pintail, Anas acuta (A)

Megapodes
Order: GalliformesFamily: Megapodiidae

The Megapodiidae are stocky, medium-large chicken-like birds with small heads and large feet. All but the malleefowl occupy jungle habitats and most have brown or black colouring.

Niuafoou scrubfowl, Megapodius pritchardii (E)

Pheasants, grouse, and allies

Order: GalliformesFamily: Phasianidae

The Phasianidae are a family of terrestrial birds which consists of quails, partridges, snowcocks, francolins, spurfowls, tragopans, monals, pheasants, peafowls and jungle fowls. In general, they are plump (although they vary in size) and have broad, relatively short wings. 

Red junglefowl, Gallus gallus

Pigeons and doves

Order: ColumbiformesFamily: Columbidae

Pigeons and doves are stout-bodied birds with short necks and short slender bills with a fleshy cere.

Rock pigeon, Columba livia (I)
Shy ground dove, Alopecoenas stairi
Many-colored fruit-dove, Ptilinopus perousii
Crimson-crowned fruit-dove, Ptilinopus porphyraceus
Pacific imperial-pigeon, Ducula pacifica

Cuckoos
Order: CuculiformesFamily: Cuculidae

The family Cuculidae includes cuckoos, roadrunners and anis. These birds are of variable size with slender bodies, long tails and strong legs. The Old World cuckoos are brood parasites.

Long-tailed koel, Eudynamys taitensis

Swifts
Order: CaprimulgiformesFamily: Apodidae

Swifts are small birds which spend the majority of their lives flying. These birds have very short legs and never settle voluntarily on the ground, perching instead only on vertical surfaces. Many swifts have long swept-back wings which resemble a crescent or boomerang.

White-rumped swiftlet, Aerodramus spodiopygius
Australian swiftlet, Aerodramus terraereginae

Rails, gallinules, and coots

Order: GruiformesFamily: Rallidae

Rallidae is a large family of small to medium-sized birds which includes the rails, crakes, coots and gallinules. Typically they inhabit dense vegetation in damp environments near lakes, swamps or rivers. In general they are shy and secretive birds, making them difficult to observe. Most species have strong legs and long toes which are well adapted to soft uneven surfaces. They tend to have short, rounded wings and to be weak fliers.

Buff-banded rail, Gallirallus philippensis
Black-backed swamphen, Porphyrio indicus
Australasian swamphen, Porphyrio melanotus
Spotless crake, Zapornia tabuensis

Plovers and lapwings

Order: CharadriiformesFamily: Charadriidae

The family Charadriidae includes the plovers, dotterels and lapwings. They are small to medium-sized birds with compact bodies, short, thick necks and long, usually pointed, wings. They are found in open country worldwide, mostly in habitats near water. 

Black-bellied plover, Pluvialis squatarola (A)
Pacific golden-plover, Pluvialis fulva

Sandpipers and allies

Order: CharadriiformesFamily: Scolopacidae

Scolopacidae is a large diverse family of small to medium-sized shorebirds including the sandpipers, curlews, godwits, shanks, tattlers, woodcocks, snipes, dowitchers and phalaropes. The majority of these species eat small invertebrates picked out of the mud or soil. Variation in length of legs and bills enables multiple species to feed in the same habitat, particularly on the coast, without direct competition for food.

Bristle-thighed curlew, Numenius tahitiensis
Bar-tailed godwit, Limosa lapponica
Ruddy turnstone, Arenaria interpres
Sanderling, Calidris alba
Wandering tattler, Tringa incana

Skuas and jaegers
Order: CharadriiformesFamily: Stercorariidae

The family Stercorariidae are, in general, medium to large birds, typically with grey or brown plumage, often with white markings on the wings. They nest on the ground in temperate and arctic regions and are long-distance migrants.

South polar skua, Stercorarius maccormicki (A)
Brown skua, Stercorarius antarcticus (A)
Pomarine jaeger, Stercorarius pomarinus (A)
Parasitic jaeger, Stercorarius parasiticus (A)

Gulls, terns, and skimmers

Order: CharadriiformesFamily: Laridae

Laridae is a family of medium to large seabirds, the gulls, terns, and skimmers. Gulls are typically grey or white, often with black markings on the head or wings. They have stout, longish bills and webbed feet. Terns are a group of generally medium to large seabirds typically with grey or white plumage, often with black markings on the head. Most terns hunt fish by diving but some pick insects off the surface of fresh water. Terns are generally long-lived birds, with several species known to live in excess of 30 years.

Brown noddy, Anous stolidus
Black noddy, Anous minutus
Gray noddy, Anous albivitta
Blue-gray noddy, Anous ceruleus
White tern, Gygis alba
Sooty tern, Onychoprion fuscatus
Gray-backed tern, Onychoprion lunatus
Bridled tern, Onychoprion anaethetus
Black-naped tern, Sterna sumatrana
Great crested tern, Thalasseus bergii

Tropicbirds

Order: PhaethontiformesFamily: Phaethontidae

Tropicbirds are slender white birds of tropical oceans, with exceptionally long central tail feathers. Their heads and long wings have black markings.

White-tailed tropicbird, Phaethon lepturus
Red-tailed tropicbird, Phaethon rubricauda

Albatrosses

Order: ProcellariiformesFamily: Diomedeidae

The albatrosses are among the largest of flying birds, and the great albatrosses from the genus Diomedea have the largest wingspans of any extant birds. 

Light-mantled albatross, Phoebetria palpebrata (A)
Wandering albatross, Diomedea exulans

Southern storm-petrels
Order: ProcellariiformesFamily: Oceanitidae

The southern storm-petrels are relatives of the petrels and are the smallest seabirds. They feed on planktonic crustaceans and small fish picked from the surface, typically while hovering. The flight is fluttering and sometimes bat-like.

Black-bellied storm-petrel, Fregetta tropica (A)
Polynesian storm-petrel, Nesofregetta fuliginosa

Shearwaters and petrels

Order: ProcellariiformesFamily: Procellariidae

The procellariids are the main group of medium-sized "true petrels", characterised by united nostrils with medium septum and a long outer functional primary.

Southern giant-petrel, Macronectes giganteus (A)
Cape petrel, Daption capense
Gray-faced petrel, Pterodroma gouldi
Kermadec petrel, Pterodroma neglecta
Herald petrel, Pterodroma heraldica
Mottled petrel, Pterodroma inexpectata
White-necked petrel, Pterodroma cervicalis
Black-winged petrel, Pterodroma nigripennis
Cook's petrel, Pterodroma cookii (A)
Gould's petrel, Pterodroma leucoptera (A)
Collared petrel, Pterodroma brevipes (A)
Stejneger's petrel, Pterodroma longirostris (A)
Phoenix petrel, Pterodroma alba (A)
Tahiti petrel, Pseudobulweria rostrata
Wedge-tailed shearwater, Ardenna pacificus
Buller's shearwater, Ardenna bulleri (A)
Sooty shearwater, Ardenna griseus
Short-tailed shearwater, Ardenna tenuirostris
Christmas shearwater, Puffinus nativitatis (A)
Tropical shearwater, Puffinus bailloni

Frigatebirds
Order: SuliformesFamily: Fregatidae

Frigatebirds are large seabirds usually found over tropical oceans. They are large, black-and-white or completely black, with long wings and deeply forked tails. The males have coloured inflatable throat pouches. They do not swim or walk and cannot take off from a flat surface. Having the largest wingspan-to-body-weight ratio of any bird, they are essentially aerial, able to stay aloft for more than a week.

Lesser frigatebird, Fregata ariel
Great frigatebird, Fregata minor

Boobies and gannets

Order: SuliformesFamily: Sulidae

The sulids comprise the gannets and boobies. Both groups are medium to large coastal seabirds that plunge-dive for fish. 

Masked booby, Sula dactylatra
Brown booby, Sula leucogaster
Red-footed booby, Sula sula

Herons, egrets, and bitterns

Order: PelecaniformesFamily: Ardeidae

The family Ardeidae contains the bitterns, herons, and egrets. Herons and egrets are medium to large wading birds with long necks and legs. Bitterns tend to be shorter necked and more wary. Members of Ardeidae fly with their necks retracted, unlike other long-necked birds such as storks, ibises and spoonbills.

White-faced heron, Egretta novaehollandiae
Pacific reef-heron, Egretta sacra
Striated heron, Butorides striata (A)

Hawks, eagles, and kites
Order: AccipitriformesFamily: Accipitridae

Accipitridae is a family of birds of prey, which includes hawks, eagles, kites, harriers and Old World vultures. These birds have powerful hooked beaks for tearing flesh from their prey, strong legs, powerful talons and keen eyesight. 

Swamp harrier, Circus approximans

Barn-owls

Order: StrigiformesFamily: Tytonidae

Barn-owls are medium to large owls with large heads and characteristic heart-shaped faces. They have long strong legs with powerful talons.

Barn owl, Tyto alba

Kingfishers

Order: CoraciiformesFamily: Alcedinidae

Kingfishers are medium-sized birds with large heads, long, pointed bills, short legs and stubby tails.

Pacific kingfisher, Todirhamphus sacer
Collared kingfisher, Todirhamphus chloris

Old World parrots

Order: PsittaciformesFamily: Psittaculidae

Characteristic features of parrots include a strong curved bill, an upright stance, strong legs, and clawed zygodactyl feet. Many parrots are vividly colored, and some are multi-colored. Old World parrots are found from Africa east across south and southeast Asia and Oceania to Australia and New Zealand.

Oceanic parrot, Eclectus infectus (Ex)
Red shining-parrot, Prosopeia tabuensis (I)
Blue-crowned lorikeet, Vini australis

Honeyeaters

Order: PasseriformesFamily: Meliphagidae

The honeyeaters are a large and diverse family of small to medium-sized birds most common in Australia and New Guinea. They are nectar feeders and closely resemble other nectar-feeding passerines.

Wattled honeyeater, Foulehaio carunculata

Cuckooshrikes

Order: PasseriformesFamily: Campephagidae

The cuckooshrikes are small to medium-sized passerine birds. They are predominantly greyish with white and black, although some species are brightly coloured.

Polynesian triller, Lalage maculosa

Whistlers and allies
Order: PasseriformesFamily: Pachycephalidae

The family Pachycephalidae includes the whistlers, shrikethrushes, and some of the pitohuis. 

Tongan whistler, Pachycephala jacquinoti (E)

Monarch flycatchers
Order: PasseriformesFamily: Monarchidae

The monarch flycatchers are small to medium-sized insectivorous passerines which hunt by flycatching.

Fiji shrikebill, Clytorhynchus vitiensis

Swallows
Order: PasseriformesFamily: Hirundinidae

The family Hirundinidae is adapted to aerial feeding. They have a slender streamlined body, long pointed wings and a short bill with a wide gape. The feet are adapted to perching rather than walking, and the front toes are partially joined at the base.

Pacific swallow, Hirundo tahitica

Bulbuls
Order: PasseriformesFamily: Pycnonotidae

Bulbuls are medium-sized songbirds. Some are colourful with yellow, red or orange vents, cheeks, throats or supercilia, but most are drab, with uniform olive-brown to black plumage. Some species have distinct crests.

Red-vented bulbul, Pycnonotus cafer (I)

Starlings

Order: PasseriformesFamily: Sturnidae

Starlings are small to medium-sized passerine birds. Their flight is strong and direct and they are very gregarious. Their preferred habitat is fairly open country. They eat insects and fruit. Plumage is typically dark with a metallic sheen.

Polynesian starling, Aplonis tabuensis
European starling, Sturnus vulgaris (I)
Common myna, Acridotheres tristis (A)
Jungle myna, Acridotheres fuscus (I)

See also
List of birds
Lists of birds by region

References

'
Tonga
birds